Arenaeus is a genus of swimming crabs in the family Portunidae. There are at least two described species in Arenaeus.

Species
These two species belong to the genus Arenaeus:
 Arenaeus cribrarius (Lamarck, 1818) (speckled swimming crab)
 Arenaeus mexicanus (Gerstaecker, 1856)

References

Further reading

External links

 

Decapods
Articles created by Qbugbot